Toko is a small rural settlement 10 kilometres east of Stratford, New Zealand, at the intersection of East Road (State Highway 43) and Toko Road. It is located on a railway, the Stratford–Okahukura Line, the western portion of which was operated as a branch line known as the Toko Branch prior to the line's completion. The Toko Stream flows through the area to join the Pātea River.

Geography
Toko is surrounded by extremely fertile land, being located on the periphery of the Taranaki ringplain and adjacent to the Pātea River. The area is drained by the Toko Stream, and its tributaries the Manawaiwiri and Waiwiri Streams. Once covered in wetlands, since settlement the area has been drained to take advantage of the fertile soils. Dairy farming predominates the surrounding land use, with some sheep and beef farming in the steeper hill country.

History
Toko was established in the 1890s, and served as an important centre for the developing hinterland. The settlement took on the nature of a village, containing a railway station, a dairy factory, a church, a hall, a hotel, a sawmill, a trucking depot, a playcentre, a sports facility, and a number of other businesses and numerous dwellings. Toko School was established in 1893, and located on a site approximately 2 km east of Toko at the intersection of East Road and Wawiri Road.

Like other rural centres, Toko went into decline in the latter part of the 20th century. The railway station, dairy factory and sawmill all closed. However the factory buildings are now used for an engineering business, and the church, hall, domain, hotel, trucking depot, and an automotive workshop are still being used for business and social activities.

Demographics

Toko had a population of 1,350 at the 2018 New Zealand census, an increase of 78 people (6.1%) since the 2013 census, and an increase of 87 people (6.9%) since the 2006 census. There were 510 households, comprising 702 males and 648 females, giving a sex ratio of 1.08 males per female. The median age was 38.1 years (compared with 37.4 years nationally), with 303 people (22.4%) aged under 15 years, 234 (17.3%) aged 15 to 29, 669 (49.6%) aged 30 to 64, and 144 (10.7%) aged 65 or older.

Ethnicities were 95.3% European/Pākehā, 7.3% Māori, 1.1% Pacific peoples, 1.3% Asian, and 2.0% other ethnicities. People may identify with more than one ethnicity.

The percentage of people born overseas was 8.4, compared with 27.1% nationally.

Although some people chose not to answer the census's question about religious affiliation, 49.3% had no religion, 38.7% were Christian, 0.4% were Hindu and 1.3% had other religions.

Of those at least 15 years old, 108 (10.3%) people had a bachelor's or higher degree, and 288 (27.5%) people had no formal qualifications. The median income was $38,200, compared with $31,800 nationally. 210 people (20.1%) earned over $70,000 compared to 17.2% nationally. The employment status of those at least 15 was that 636 (60.7%) people were employed full-time, 174 (16.6%) were part-time, and 21 (2.0%) were unemployed.

Born in Toko
Jack Walter, All Black and Taranaki rugby football representative
Toss Woollaston, New Zealand painter (1910–1998)
Brian Smith, jazz musician (1939 - )

Other notable residents
Sylvia Ashton-Warner, (as a child) New Zealand writer, poet and educator

Education
Toko School is a coeducational full primary (years 1–8) school with a roll of  students as of  The school was founded in 1893.

Notes

External links
 Toko School website

References
Church, Ian (1990), The Stratford Inheritance. Heritage Press Ltd., Waikanae, New Zealand.

Further reading

General historical works

Schools

Populated places in Taranaki
Stratford District, New Zealand